Alkaloids are a class of basic, naturally occurring organic compounds that contain at least one nitrogen atom. This group also includes some related compounds with neutral and even weakly acidic properties. Some synthetic compounds of similar structure may also be termed alkaloids. In addition to carbon, hydrogen and nitrogen, alkaloids may also contain oxygen, sulfur and, more rarely, other elements such as chlorine, bromine, and phosphorus.

Alkaloids are produced by a large variety of organisms including bacteria, fungi, plants, and animals. They can be purified from crude extracts of these organisms by acid-base extraction, or solvent extractions followed by silica-gel column chromatography. Alkaloids have a wide range of pharmacological activities including antimalarial (e.g. quinine), antiasthma (e.g. ephedrine), anticancer (e.g. homoharringtonine), cholinomimetic (e.g. galantamine), vasodilatory (e.g. vincamine), antiarrhythmic (e.g. quinidine), analgesic (e.g. morphine), antibacterial (e.g. chelerythrine), and antihyperglycemic activities (e.g. piperine). Many have found use in traditional or modern medicine, or as starting points for drug discovery. Other alkaloids possess psychotropic (e.g. psilocin) and stimulant activities (e.g. cocaine, caffeine, nicotine, theobromine), and have been used in entheogenic rituals or as recreational drugs. Alkaloids can be toxic too (e.g. atropine, tubocurarine). Although alkaloids act on a diversity of metabolic systems in humans and other animals, they almost uniformly evoke a bitter taste.

The boundary between alkaloids and other nitrogen-containing natural compounds is not clear-cut. Compounds like amino acid peptides, proteins, nucleotides, nucleic acid, amines, and antibiotics are usually not called alkaloids. Natural compounds containing nitrogen in the exocyclic position (mescaline, serotonin, dopamine, etc.) are usually classified as amines rather than as alkaloids. Some authors, however, consider alkaloids a special case of amines.

Naming

The name "alkaloids" was introduced in 1819 by the German chemist Carl Friedrich Wilhelm Meißner, and is derived from late Latin root  and the Greek-language suffix  -('like'). However, the term came into wide use only after the publication of a review article, by Oscar Jacobsen in the chemical dictionary of Albert Ladenburg in the 1880s.

There is no unique method for naming alkaloids. Many individual names are formed by adding the suffix "ine" to the species or genus name. For example, atropine is isolated from the plant Atropa belladonna; strychnine is obtained from the seed of the Strychnine tree (Strychnos nux-vomica L.). Where several alkaloids are extracted from one plant their names are often distinguished by variations in the suffix: "idine", "anine", "aline", "inine" etc. There are also at least 86 alkaloids whose names contain the root "vin" because they are extracted from vinca plants such as Vinca rosea (Catharanthus roseus); these are called vinca alkaloids.

History 

Alkaloid-containing plants have been used by humans since ancient times for therapeutic and recreational purposes. For example, medicinal plants have been known in Mesopotamia from about 2000 BC. The Odyssey of Homer referred to a gift given to Helen by the Egyptian queen, a drug bringing oblivion. It is believed that the gift was an opium-containing drug. A Chinese book on houseplants written in 1st–3rd centuries BC mentioned a medical use of ephedra and opium poppies. Also, coca leaves have been used by Indigenous South Americans since ancient times.

Extracts from plants containing toxic alkaloids, such as aconitine and tubocurarine, were used since antiquity for poisoning arrows.

Studies of alkaloids began in the 19th century. In 1804, the German chemist Friedrich Sertürner isolated from opium a "soporific principle", which he called "morphium", referring to Morpheus, the Greek god of dreams; in German and some other Central-European languages, this is still the name of the drug. The term "morphine", used in English and French, was given by the French physicist Joseph Louis Gay-Lussac.

A significant contribution to the chemistry of alkaloids in the early years of its development was made by the French researchers Pierre Joseph Pelletier and Joseph Bienaimé Caventou, who discovered quinine (1820) and strychnine (1818). Several other alkaloids were discovered around that time, including xanthine (1817), atropine (1819), caffeine (1820), coniine (1827), nicotine (1828), colchicine (1833), sparteine (1851), and cocaine (1860). The development of the chemistry of alkaloids was accelerated by the emergence of spectroscopic and chromatographic methods in the 20th century, so that by 2008 more than 12,000 alkaloids had been identified.

The first complete synthesis of an alkaloid was achieved in 1886 by the German chemist Albert Ladenburg. He produced coniine by reacting 2-methylpyridine with acetaldehyde and reducing the resulting 2-propenyl pyridine with sodium.

Classifications 

Compared with most other classes of natural compounds, alkaloids are characterized by a great structural diversity. There is no uniform classification. Initially, when knowledge of chemical structures was lacking, botanical classification of the source plants was relied on. This classification is now considered obsolete.

More recent classifications are based on similarity of the carbon skeleton (e.g., indole-, isoquinoline-, and pyridine-like) or biochemical precursor (ornithine, lysine, tyrosine, tryptophan, etc.). However, they require compromises in borderline cases; for example, nicotine contains a pyridine fragment from nicotinamide and a pyrrolidine part from ornithine and therefore can be assigned to both classes.

Alkaloids are often divided into the following major groups:

 "True alkaloids" contain nitrogen in the heterocycle and originate from amino acids. Their characteristic examples are atropine, nicotine, and morphine. This group also includes some alkaloids that besides the nitrogen heterocycle contain terpene (e.g., evonine) or peptide fragments (e.g. ergotamine). The piperidine alkaloids coniine and coniceine may be regarded as true alkaloids (rather than pseudoalkaloids: see below) although they do not originate from amino acids.
 "Protoalkaloids", which contain nitrogen (but not the nitrogen heterocycle) and also originate from amino acids. Examples include mescaline, adrenaline and ephedrine.
 Polyamine alkaloids – derivatives of putrescine, spermidine, and spermine.
 Peptide and cyclopeptide alkaloids.
 Pseudoalkaloids – alkaloid-like compounds that do not originate from amino acids. This group includes terpene-like and steroid-like alkaloids, as well as purine-like alkaloids such as caffeine, theobromine, theacrine and theophylline. Some authors classify ephedrine and cathinone as pseudoalkaloids. Those originate from the amino acid phenylalanine, but acquire their nitrogen atom not from the amino acid but through transamination.

Some alkaloids do not have the carbon skeleton characteristic of their group. So, galanthamine and homoaporphines do not contain isoquinoline fragment, but are, in general, attributed to isoquinoline alkaloids.

Main classes of monomeric alkaloids are listed in the table below:

Properties 

Most alkaloids contain oxygen in their molecular structure; those compounds are usually colorless crystals at ambient conditions. Oxygen-free alkaloids, such as nicotine or coniine, are typically volatile, colorless, oily liquids. Some alkaloids are colored, like berberine (yellow) and sanguinarine (orange).

Most alkaloids are weak bases, but some, such as theobromine and theophylline, are amphoteric. Many alkaloids dissolve poorly in water but readily dissolve in organic solvents, such as diethyl ether, chloroform or 1,2-dichloroethane. Caffeine, cocaine, codeine and nicotine are slightly soluble in water (with a solubility of ≥1g/L), whereas others, including morphine and yohimbine are very slightly water-soluble (0.1–1 g/L). Alkaloids and acids form salts of various strengths. These salts are usually freely soluble in water and ethanol and poorly soluble in most organic solvents. Exceptions include scopolamine hydrobromide, which is soluble in organic solvents, and the water-soluble quinine sulfate.

Most alkaloids have a bitter taste or are poisonous when ingested. Alkaloid production in plants appeared to have evolved in response to feeding by herbivorous animals; however, some animals have evolved the ability to detoxify alkaloids. Some alkaloids can produce developmental defects in the offspring of animals that consume but cannot detoxify the alkaloids. One example is the alkaloid cyclopamine, produced in the leaves of corn lily. During the 1950s, up to 25% of lambs born by sheep that had grazed on corn lily had serious facial deformations. These ranged from deformed jaws to cyclopia (see picture). After decades of research, in the 1980s, the compound responsible for these deformities was identified as the alkaloid 11-deoxyjervine, later renamed to cyclopamine.

Distribution in nature

Alkaloids are generated by various living organisms, especially by higher plants – about 10 to 25% of those contain alkaloids. Therefore, in the past the term "alkaloid" was associated with plants.

The alkaloids content in plants is usually within a few percent and is inhomogeneous over the plant tissues. Depending on the type of plants, the maximum concentration is observed in the leaves (for example, black henbane), fruits or seeds (Strychnine tree), root (Rauvolfia serpentina) or bark (cinchona). Furthermore, different tissues of the same plants may contain different alkaloids.

Beside plants, alkaloids are found in certain types of fungus, such as psilocybin in the fruiting bodies of the genus Psilocybe, and in animals, such as bufotenin in the skin of some toads  and a number of insects, markedly ants. Many marine organisms also contain alkaloids. Some amines, such as adrenaline and serotonin, which play an important role in higher animals, are similar to alkaloids in their structure and biosynthesis and are sometimes called alkaloids.

Extraction

Because of the structural diversity of alkaloids, there is no single method of their extraction from natural raw materials. Most methods exploit the property of most alkaloids to be soluble in organic solvents  but not in water, and the opposite tendency of their salts.

Most plants contain several alkaloids. Their mixture is extracted first and then individual alkaloids are separated. Plants are thoroughly ground before extraction. Most alkaloids are present in the raw plants in the form of salts of organic acids. The extracted alkaloids may remain salts or change into bases. Base extraction is achieved by processing the raw material with alkaline solutions and extracting the alkaloid bases with organic solvents, such as 1,2-dichloroethane, chloroform, diethyl ether or benzene. Then, the impurities are dissolved by weak acids; this converts alkaloid bases into salts that are washed away with water. If necessary, an aqueous solution of alkaloid salts is again made alkaline and treated with an organic solvent. The process is repeated until the desired purity is achieved.

In the acidic extraction, the raw plant material is processed by a weak acidic solution (e.g., acetic acid in water, ethanol, or methanol). A base is then added to convert alkaloids to basic forms that are extracted with organic solvent (if the extraction was performed with alcohol, it is removed first, and the remainder is dissolved in water). The solution is purified as described above.

Alkaloids are separated from their mixture using their different solubility in certain solvents and different reactivity with certain reagents or by distillation.

A number of alkaloids are identified from insects, among which the fire ant venom alkaloids known as solenopsins have received greater attention from researchers. These insect alkaloids can be efficiently extracted by solvent immersion of live fire ants  or by centrifugation of live ants  followed by silica-gel chromatography purification. Tracking and dosing the extracted solenopsin ant alkaloids has been described as possible based on their absorbance peak around 232 nanometers.

Biosynthesis
Biological precursors of most alkaloids are amino acids, such as ornithine, lysine, phenylalanine, tyrosine, tryptophan, histidine, aspartic acid, and anthranilic acid. Nicotinic acid can be synthesized from tryptophan or aspartic acid. Ways of alkaloid biosynthesis are too numerous and cannot be easily classified. However, there are a few typical reactions involved in the biosynthesis of various classes of alkaloids, including synthesis of Schiff bases and Mannich reaction.

Synthesis of Schiff bases

Schiff bases can be obtained by reacting amines with ketones or aldehydes. These reactions are a common method of producing C=N bonds.

In the biosynthesis of alkaloids, such reactions may take place within a molecule, such as in the synthesis of piperidine:

Mannich reaction

An integral component of the Mannich reaction, in addition to an amine and a carbonyl compound, is a carbanion, which plays the role of the nucleophile in the nucleophilic addition to the ion formed by the reaction of the amine and the carbonyl.

The Mannich reaction can proceed both intermolecularly and intramolecularly:

Dimer alkaloids
In addition to the described above monomeric alkaloids, there are also dimeric, and even trimeric and tetrameric alkaloids formed upon condensation of two, three, and four monomeric alkaloids. Dimeric alkaloids are usually formed from monomers of the same type through the following mechanisms:
 Mannich reaction, resulting in, e.g., voacamine
 Michael reaction (villalstonine)
 Condensation of aldehydes with amines (toxiferine)
 Oxidative addition of phenols (dauricine, tubocurarine)
 Lactonization (carpaine).

There are also dimeric alkaloids formed from two distinct monomers, such as the vinca alkaloids vinblastine and vincristine, which are formed from the coupling of catharanthine and vindoline. The newer semi-synthetic chemotherapeutic agent vinorelbine is used in the treatment of non-small-cell lung cancer. It is another derivative dimer of vindoline and catharanthine and is synthesised from anhydrovinblastine, starting either from leurosine or the monomers themselves.

Biological role
Alkaloids are among the most important and best-known secondary metabolites, i.e. biogenic substances not directly involved in the normal growth, development, or reproduction of the organism. Instead, they generally mediate ecological interactions, which may produce a selective advantage for the organism by increasing its survivability or fecundity. In some cases their function, if any, remains unclear. An early hypothesis, that alkaloids are the final products of nitrogen metabolism in plants, as urea and uric acid are in mammals, was refuted by the finding that their concentration fluctuates rather than steadily increasing.

Most of the known functions of alkaloids are related to protection. For example, aporphine alkaloid liriodenine produced by the tulip tree protects it from parasitic mushrooms. In addition, the presence of alkaloids in the plant prevents insects and chordate animals from eating it. However, some animals are adapted to alkaloids and even use them in their own metabolism. Such alkaloid-related substances as serotonin, dopamine and histamine are important neurotransmitters in animals. Alkaloids are also known to regulate plant growth. One example of an organism that uses alkaloids for protection is the Utetheisa ornatrix, more commonly known as the ornate moth. Pyrrolizidine alkaloids render these larvae and adult moths unpalatable to many of their natural enemies like coccinelid beetles, green lacewings, insectivorous hemiptera and insectivorous bats. Another example of alkaloids being utilized occurs in the poison hemlock moth (Agonopterix alstroemeriana). This moth feeds on its highly toxic and alkaloid-rich host plant poison hemlock (Conium maculatum) during its larval stage. A. alstroemeriana may benefit twofold from the toxicity of the naturally-occurring alkaloids, both through the unpalatability of the species to predators and through the ability of A. alstroemeriana to recognize Conium maculatum as the correct location for oviposition. A fire ant venom alkaloid known as solenopsin has been demonstrated to protect queens of invasive fire ants during the foundation of new nests, thus playing a central role in the spread of this pest ant species around the world.

Applications

In medicine
Medical use of alkaloid-containing plants has a long history, and, thus, when the first alkaloids were isolated in the 19th century, they immediately found application in clinical practice. Many alkaloids are still used in medicine, usually in the form of salts widely used including the following:

Many synthetic and semisynthetic drugs are structural modifications of the alkaloids, which were designed to enhance or change the primary effect of the drug and reduce unwanted side-effects. For example, naloxone, an opioid receptor antagonist, is a derivative of thebaine that is present in opium.

In agriculture 
Prior to the development of a wide range of relatively low-toxic synthetic pesticides, some alkaloids, such as salts of nicotine and anabasine, were used as insecticides. Their use was limited by their high toxicity to humans.

Use as psychoactive drugs 
Preparations of plants containing alkaloids and their extracts, and later pure alkaloids, have long been used as psychoactive substances. Cocaine, caffeine, and cathinone are stimulants of the central nervous system. Mescaline and many indole alkaloids (such as psilocybin, dimethyltryptamine and ibogaine) have hallucinogenic effect. Morphine and codeine are strong narcotic pain killers.

There are alkaloids that do not have strong psychoactive effect themselves, but are precursors for semi-synthetic psychoactive drugs. For example, ephedrine and pseudoephedrine are used to produce methcathinone and methamphetamine. Thebaine is used in the synthesis of many painkillers such as oxycodone.

See also 

 Amine
 Base (chemistry)
 List of poisonous plants
 Mayer's reagent
 Natural products
 Palau'amine
 Secondary metabolite

Explanatory notes

Citations

General and cited references

External links